Balearic cuisine is a Mediterranean cuisine as cooked in the Balearic Islands, Spain. It can be regarded as part of a wider Catalan cuisine, since it shares many dishes and ingredients with Catalonia and the Valencian Community. Others view it as part of a more global Spanish cuisine. Traditional Balearic cuisine is rich in vegetables, cereal and legumes as well as being low in fats. A succinct selection of the primary dishes would be ensaimades, seafood and vegetable stews, sobrassada, coques, tombet, Maó cheese and wine.

Bakery and confectionery 

Unsalted bread
Ensaïmada: Lard- based pastry sprinkled with powdered sugar.
Flaó: Cottage cheese tart. The recipe includes eggs, cottage cheese, sugar and mint. The mixture of savoury and sweet flavourings may reflect Arab influence from the Islamic past of the islands.
Coca: Similar to Italian pizza but without cheese. Typically, Majorcan varieties include julivert (parsley), pebres torrats (roasted peppers), and trempó (tomato, green pepper and onion salad).
Easter baking products
Panades: lamb and pea pasties.
Robiol: cottage cheese- or jam-stuffed pastry
 is a Majorcan kind of biscuit.

Vegetables 

Traditional vegetables dishes are:
Tombet: Fried courgettes, potatoes, eggplant and red peppers baked in tomato sauce, related to similar Mediterranean dishes such as samfaina or ratatouille.
: Fava bean and mixed vegetable puree
: made of pepper, onion and tomato; eat with mussels, in coques, as a salad, etc.
: made of vegetables, broth, and bread slices.

Meat 

Sobrassada sausage
, : lamb and piglet roasts
Albergínies o carabassons farcits: Eggplants (aubergines) or zucchinis (courgettes) stuffed with minced meat
: "Dirty rice"—meat, vegetables, rice and spices cooked in a meat broth.
: bulgur with local specialities as botifarra, etc.
: penne in a sauce similar to British gravy

Fish 

: Lobster stew
Baked fish, such as anfós (grouper)
Arròs de peix: rice cooked in a fish broth with fish pieces

Fats 
Olive oil is the most commonly used fat in Balearic cooking. Butter is used sparingly, even in dishes frequently relying upon butter in other parts of the world, e.g., ous ferrats (fried eggs)
Mayonnaise is called all i oli, 'garlic and oil' in Catalan. Some historians argue that mayonnaise originates from Mahon (known in Catalan as Maó), the capital of the Balearic island of Menorca.

Other 

Maó cheese: a hard cow's milk cheese similar to Grana Padano or Parmesan
Red wines from the Binissalem and Pla i Llevant areas.
Escargots: Snails are eaten in a stew, also containing meat, potatoes, and fennel. Snails are also eaten sometimes in paella.

See also
Catalan cuisine
Valencian cuisine
Spanish cuisine

External links

 Menorcan cuisine. Recipes of traditional cuisine and gastronomy of Menorca. Discovering Menorca.
 Balearic Cuisine Take a taste of Islas Baleares

 
Spanish cuisine
Spanish cuisine by autonomous community